Tigris was launched in Newcastle-upon-Tyne in 1802. She made six voyages between 1803 and 1815 as an "extra ship" for the British East India Company (EIC). After her stint as an East Indiaman, Tigris became a West Indiaman. She was wrecked in December 1823.

East Indiaman
Tigris first appeared in Lloyd's Register (LR) in 1803 as "Tigress".

On 1 April 1803, the EIC contracted with Thomas Hurry for Tigris to perform six voyages at a peace time freight rate of £13 10s per ton for 525 tons.
 
Tigris made two voyages under the command of Captain Charles Graham. War with France had broken out and he acquired a letter of marque on 3 June 1803.

1st EIC voyage: Tigris sailed on 30 June 1803, bound for Madeira and Bengal. She returned on 11 December 1804. 

2nd EIC voyage: Tigris sailed on 31 August and 1805, bound for Madeira, the Coromandel Coast, and Bengal. She returned on 15 April 1807.

Tigris made four voyages under the command of Captain Dugald MacDougall. He had acquired a letter of marque on 30 June 1807. 

3rd EIC voyage: Tigris sailed on 17 September 1807, bound for Madeira, Madras, and Bengal. On 18 December Tigris, M'Dougal, master, was at the Cape of Good Hope, having come from London and Madeira. On 19 January 1809, she was back at the Cape, having come from Bengal. She returned on 23 May 1809. 

4th EIC voyage: Tigris sailed on 14 March 1810, bound for Madras and Bengal. On 8 July Tigris arrived at Madras. On 11 November she left Bengal and was at St Helena on 2 February 1811. She returned on 20 April. 
 
5th EIC voyage: Tigris sailed for St Helena and Bengal in October 1811. However, on 24 October she got on the Pan Sand near Margate. She was lightened and got off, but had to return to the Thames for repairs. On 17 December  provided assistance to Tigris. On 19 December Tigris had to put back to Margate Roads, having lost anchors and cables. She finally sailed on 4 January 1812. She returned on 18 May 1813. 

6th EIC voyage: Tigris sailed on 8 June 1814, bound for Madeira and Bombay. She returned on 26 June 1815.

West Indiaman
In 1815 Tigris was sold and her new owners employed her as a West Indiaman. She entered Lloyd's Register (LR) in 1815 both as Tigress and Tigris.

Fate
On 4 December 1823 Tigris, Fotheringham, master, wrecked off Tynemouth in a gale. Her Second Officer and boatswain lost their lives. She had been sailing from London to Shields.

Notes, citations, and references
Notes

Citations

References
 
 

1800s ships
Ships built on the River Tyne
Age of Sail merchant ships of England
Ships of the British East India Company
Maritime incidents in December 1823